This is a listing of discography from the group ZOEgirl.

Discography

Studio albums

Remix albums

Compilation albums

Karaoke albums
Open Mic Karaoke, Volume 1, 2003 (Sparrow / EMD)
Open Mic Karaoke, Volume 2, 2004 (Sparrow / EMD)

Singles

Non-album songs and contributions
"I'll Try" (Recorded for Life)
"Faith Enough" (w/ Carman)... Heart of a Champion (2001)
"Angels We Have Heard On High"... WOW Christmas: Red (2002)
"Testify to Love (New Birth Mix)" (w/ Avalon)... O2: Avalon Remixed (2002)
"Higher" (Duet w/ The Katinas)... It Takes Two (2003)
"Jesus, Lover of My Soul"... WOW Worship: Red (2004)
"What Child Is This?"... WOW Christmas: Green (2005)
"Last Real Love" (Recorded for Room to Breathe) - Available on iTunes
"Wanna Be Like You" (Recorded for Room to Breathe)

In popular media

Video games
ZOEgirl has a total of nine songs which appear in rhythm games.  Seven of them can be found in Digital Praise titles: six in the Dance Praise series, and one in Guitar Praise Expansion Pack 1:

ZOEgirl songs were also used in Heavenly Harmony Gold and JAMband.  The former is a karaoke game, while the latter adds support for band-like gameplay using guitar, bass and drum instrument controllers.  "I Believe", "Beautiful Name", "You Get Me", "Safe" and "Scream" are some of the songs used in the games.

References

Discographies of American artists
Pop music group discographies
Christian music discographies